Bridesburg station is a SEPTA Regional Rail station in Philadelphia, Pennsylvania. Located at Bridge Street and Harbison Avenue in the Bridesburg neighborhood of Northeast Philadelphia, it serves the Trenton Line.

The station is in zone 2 on the SEPTA Trenton Line, on the Amtrak Northeast Corridor, and is 10.2 track miles from Suburban Station. In 2005, this station saw 162 boardings on an average weekday. Amtrak does not stop at this station.

Station layout
A walkway over the freight track allows passengers to board Trenton-bound trains from the outer passenger service track.

References

External links
 Current schedule for the SEPTA Trenton Line
 SEPTA station page for Bridesburg
 Bridge Street entrance from Google Maps Street View

SEPTA Regional Rail stations
Former Pennsylvania Railroad stations
Stations on the Northeast Corridor